Gerard "Gerry" Thomas Ryan  (born ) is an Australian businessman, investor, racehorse owner and sports enthusiast. According to the Financial Review Rich List 2018 his net worth was assessed at 487 million, as Australia's 176th richest person. He is the owner and founder of Jayco Australia, as well as owning wineries, resorts, the theatrical company Global Creatures, the Jayco Southside Flyers in the Women's National Basketball League, and is part-owner of online retailer BikeExchange and My Local Group. In 2011, with his son Andrew, he acquired Mitchelton Wines from Lion Nathan.

Sports
Ryan owned a partial interest in football club Brisbane Roar FC, which he has since sold. Along with Bart Campbell, Matt Tripp and Michael Watt, he has been one of the co-owners of NRL team Melbourne Storm since 2013, being Club Director until 2010, and has also been a board member of St Kilda Football Club in the AFL.

Ryan's interest in cycling began in 1992 when he invested in Kathy Watt, paying for her to attend the Barcelona Olympics where she won two medals. He is now part owner and founder of Mitchelton–Scott men's professional cycling team, formerly known as the GreenEDGE Cycling team; and was President of Cycling Australia for 2013, stepping down in 2014.

Ryan has been the primary sponsor of the Jayco Australian Opals since 2010, and the women's basketball team Dandenong Jayco Rangers since 1997. In 2013, he was awarded the Australian Olympic Committee's Order of Merit for contributions to sport.

Ryan was half-owner of 2010 Melbourne Cup winner Americain, and remains sole owner of 2012 Bendigo Cup winner Puissance de Lune.

Awards and honours 
In 2000 Ryan was awarded the Medal of the Order of Australia for service to the community, particularly as a supporter of sporting and charitable organisations, and to youth.

Ryan was one of five inaugural inductees to the Victorian Caravan Industry Hall of Fame in 2012, and was inducted into the Victorian Government's Manufacturing Hall of Fame in 2014 for his contributions to manufacturing excellence. Ryan was awarded the Australian Olympic Committee Order of Merit in 2013 for remarkable merit in the sporting world, through his personal achievement and contribution to the development of sport. In 2015, he was an inaugural Cycling Australia Hall of Fame inductee.

Personal life
Ryan's three children are Andrew Ryan, Sarah DeBoer, and Michael Ryan.

In 2014, the BRW Rich 200, the forerunner to the Financial Review Rich List, assessed Ryan's net worth at 340 million. Ryan did not meet the threshold to appear on the Financial Review 2019 Rich List.

References

Living people
Businesspeople from Melbourne
Recipients of the Medal of the Order of Australia
Year of birth missing (living people)